A corbel is a piece of stone jutting out of a wall to carry weight.
 A series of corbelled pieces produce a Corbel arch or vault.

Corbel may also refer to:
 Corbel, Savoie, Rhône-Alpes, France
 Corbel (typeface), a sans-serif typeface published by Microsoft
 Cécile Corbel (born 1980), French singer and musician
 Erwann Corbel (born 1991), French cyclist

See also 
 Corbell (disambiguation)
 Korbel (disambiguation)